|}

The Boylesports Gold Cup is a Grade 1 National Hunt steeplechase in Ireland which is open to horses aged five years or older. It is run at Fairyhouse over a distance of about 2 miles and 4 furlongs (4,023 metres), and during its running there are sixteen fences to be jumped. The race is for novice chasers, and it is scheduled to take place each year on Easter Sunday.

The event  was formerly sponsored by Irish Distillers, the producers of Powers Whiskey and from 2015 to 2019 it was sponsored by Irish airline Ryanair. In 2021 it was sponsored by Underwriting Exchange and since 2022 it has been sponsored by BoyleSports. It is run during the Fairyhouse Easter Festival, a three-day meeting which also features the Irish Grand National. Prior to 1994 it was contested over 2 miles and 2 furlongs.

Records
Leading jockey since 1960 (4 wins):
 Paul Carberry – Thari (2003), Conna Castle (2008), Aran Concerto (2009), Realt Dubh (2011)

Leading trainer since 1960 (5 wins):
 Jim Dreaper – Vulforo (1973), Ballyross (1978), Persian Wanderer (1979), Carvill's Hill (1989), Merry Gale (1994)

Winners since 1960

See also
 Horse racing in Ireland
 List of Irish National Hunt races

References
 Racing Post:

 pedigreequery.com – Powers Gold Cup – Fairyhouse.

National Hunt races in Ireland
National Hunt chases
Fairyhouse Racecourse